Julien Simon-Chautemps (born 14 May 1978) is a French motor racing engineer. He has been race engineer of the Sauber Formula One team since 2017.

Career
Simon-Chautemps is a graduate of the French Institut polytechnique des sciences avancées (2002). He started his career as Technical Director of Prema Powerteam (2003-2007) and then to Trident Racing (2007). He moved to Formula One in 2007. From 2007 to 2010 he was race engineer to Jarno Trulli at Toyota and Lotus. In 2011 he moved to Renault, and was engineer to Vitaly Petrov, Kimi Räikkönen, Pastor Maldonado, Romain Grosjean and Jolyon Palmer.

In 2017, Simon-Chautemps moved to Sauber. which was rebranded to Alfa Romeo in 2019. When Räikkönen joined Alfa Romeo in 2019, Chautemps became his race engineer for the second time.

References

External links
 

1978 births
Living people
Institut Polytechnique des Sciences Avancées alumni
French motorsport people
French automotive engineers
Formula One engineers
Renault people
Alfa Romeo people